The Craft Guild of Chefs is the main professional association for chefs in the UK.

Established in 1885 under its former name of the Cookery and Food Association, it is sited near Kew Gardens station in the London Borough of Richmond upon Thames. It holds the annual National Chef of the Year awards.

Graduate Awards 
Craft Guild of Chefs host its Graduate Awards at the University College Birmingham.

References

External links
 Craft Guild of Chefs

1965 establishments in England
British cuisine
Guilds in England
Hospitality industry in the United Kingdom
Kew, London
Organisations based in the London Borough of Richmond upon Thames
Organizations established in 1965
Professional associations based in the United Kingdom